First Lieutenant Shelby F. Westbrook (January 15, 1922 – August 17, 2016) was a Tuskegee Airman active during World War II.

Early life
Shelby Westbrook was born in the small town of Marked Tree, Arkansas on January 15, 1922. When he was twelve years old, his parents died. Shortly after, Westbrook moved to Toledo, Ohio to live with his older brother. He attended Libbey High School, an integrated high school. Westbrook graduated in 1939.

Air Force

Training
In March 1943, Westbrook enrolled in aviation cadet training at Tuskegee Army Air Field. He knew he didn't want to be in the infantry, despite the fact he had never been in an airplane before. On February 8, 1944, he completed his pilot training (class 44-b) and was sent to Selfridge Air Field near Detroit, Michigan. During his time here, Second Lieutenant Westbrook trained in single-engine fighter planes.

Combat
Westbrook was attached to the 99th Fighter Squadron of the 332nd Fighter Group. This was one of the first all Black units formed by the Army Air Corps. After further training in South Carolina, the 99th Fighter Squadron was sent to Italy in July 1944. As a combat pilot, he flew 60 missions over 12 countries in Europe. Westbrook was promoted to First Lieutenant, and served in the 332nd Fighter Group from July 1944 to May 1945.

On his 31st mission, his P-51 Mustang developed engine trouble. Westbrook was forced to land in Yugoslavia with his wingman, and was rescued by a group of Marshal Josip Broz Tito's Partisans. They were sent to a group of British Intelligence officers led by Randolph Churchill and Evelyn Waugh. About one month later he was back on duty.

On a strafing mission over Southern France, Westbrook witnessed fellow pilot Richard Macon crash into a building near Montpellier. Because it happened so quickly, the U.S. had no record of it. More than fifty years later, First Lieutenant Westbrook was able to confirm this happened as he was doing research with French-language materials. Macon had crashed into a German command outpost with more than 40 officers inside.

On R&R Westbrook traveled to Naples, Rome, and Vatican City. He met the Pope when his group visited the Sistine Chapel.

Awards
For his service in Europe, Westbrook was awarded the Distinguished Flying Cross, the Air Medal with five Clusters, the Presidential Unit Citation, the 15th Air Force Certificate of Valor, and five Battle Stars, as well as an air-to-air victory over a German Bf 109 fighter on October 4, 1944.

In 2007, First Lieutenant Westbrook accepted a Congressional Gold Medal, which is the highest civilian award given by the United States Congress. On November 8, 2013, Westbrook was presented the French Legion of Honor, along with five other Chicago-area World War II veterans, for their "extraordinary bravery in liberating France during World War II."

Later years 
Westbrook returned to the United States in 1945. He had planned to attend engineering school, but was turned down by the director of the school. It wouldn't accept black students. After this setback, Westbrook moved to Chicago and earned his Bachelor of Science degree in Electronics from the American Television Institute of Technology.

He was employed as an electrical engineer at W. R. Grace & Co., which was a major manufacturing facility that made packaging machines. During his 18 years there, Westbrook designed various types of electronic control circuits. He is listed as the co-inventor of a patented processing system that is still used.

He was the editor of the book, Tuskegee Airmen 1941-1945. Shelby Westbrook also wrote and published a book "Bolo Pacha"; the story of a double spy during World War I.

Personal life 
Shelby Westbrook married Lulu Bell Leonard in 1952. They resided on the South Side of Chicago in the same house until her death in 2006.

Death and legacy
Westbrook died on August 17, 2016.

His papers are held by the Chicago Public Library.

See also
Tuskegee Airmen
WWII in HD

References

External links and further reading
Number of air craft lost by Tuskegee questioned at Air Force Times 
Shelby Westbrook at Army Air Corps Library and Museum
Tuskegee Airmen watch their history on silver screen at ABC7 news

Tuskegee Airmen
1922 births
2016 deaths
People from Poinsett County, Arkansas
People from Chicago
Congressional Gold Medal recipients
Recipients of the Distinguished Flying Cross (United States)
Recipients of the Air Medal
Writers from Arkansas
Writers from Chicago
Aviators from Arkansas
African-American aviators
21st-century African-American people